Allendale is a village in Wabash Precinct, Wabash County, Illinois. The population was 475 at the 2010 census.

History 
Allendale was founded in 1869, taking its name from Colonel C. M. Allen, a railroad official.

1989 tornado
On January 7, 1989, an F4 tornado leveled a good portion of the town of Allendale and injured 55 of its residents.
The tornado directly impacted Allendale's school, destroying the grade school portion, built in the 1960s. The high school portion, built in the late 1920s, withstood the storm with minimal damage, despite being condemned two years earlier due to lobbying by Mt. Carmel's District 348 in an attempt to usurp District 17. Relief funds paid to build a brand new school to be used by the elementary and middle school students of District 17.

Geography

Demographics

As of the census of 2000, there were 528 people, 192 households, and 142 families residing in the village. The racial makeup of the village was 97.92% White, 0.76% African American, 0.95% from other races, and 0.38% from two or more races. Hispanic or Latino of any race were 1.14% of the population.

There were 192 households, out of which 35.4% had children under the age of 18 living with them, 60.9% were married couples living together, 10.4% had a female householder with no husband present, and 26.0% were non-families. 25.5% of all households were made up of individuals, and 12.0% had someone living alone who was 65 years of age or older. The average household size was 2.65 and the average family size was 3.20.

In the village, the population was spread out, with 28.4% under the age of 18, 10.2% from 18 to 24, 25.8% from 25 to 44, 23.7% from 45 to 64, and 11.9% who were 65 years of age or older. The median age was 37 years. For every 100 females, there were 98.5 males. For every 100 females age 18 and over, there were 93.8 males.

The median income for a household in the village was $31,705, and the median income for a family was $38,472. Males had a median income of $30,000 versus $16,719 for females. The per capita income for the village was $12,117. About 12.1% of families and 16.6% of the population were below the poverty line, including 26.4% of those under age 18 and 1.9% of those age 65 or over.

Notes

Villages in Illinois
Villages in Wabash County, Illinois